Scientific Research Institute of System Analysis (abbrev. SRISA/NIISI RAS) - is Russian state research and development institution in the field of complex applications, an initiative of the Russian Academy of Sciences. The mission of the institute is to resolve complex applied problems on the basis of fundamental and applied mathematics in combination with the methods of practical computing. Founded by the Decree no. 1174 of the Presidium of the USSR Academy of Sciences on October 1, 1986.

Research fields 
Main lines of activities:

 research in the field of theoretical and applied problems on information security,
 research in the field of automation of programming,
 research in the field of creating computer models of the objects with complex geometry and topology for the open scalable system of parallel information processing,
 research in the field of applied informatics.

Practical results of the institute are embedded into the developed architectures and very-large-scale integration devices, operating systems, real-time operating systems and microelectronics components.

Development

Microprocessors 
The SRISA has designed several MIPS compatible CPUs for general purpose calculations. These include:
 KOMDIV-32 is a family of 32-bit microprocessors, MIPS-I ISA
 KOMDIV-64 is a family of 64-bit microprocessors, MIPS-IV ISA

Operating systems 
Since 1998 the SRISA department of System Programming has develop several successive UNIX-like real-time operating system (RTOS) that include:

 POSIX 1003.1-compatible RTOS developed since January 1998; the network sockets, however, were borrowed from Free BSD; it supported TCP/IP protocol and X Window suite; it runs on MIPS based CPUs mentioned above.
 POSIX 1003.1 and Arinc 653-compatible RTOS was first exhibited at SofTool-2008, -2009, and -2010 in Moscow. It was joint project between Alt Linux and SRISA teams.

Notable people 

 Vladimir Betelin, academician,Scientific Supervisor
 Israel Gelfand, academician, Chief Science Officer of SRISA
 Vladimir Platonov, academician, Chief Science Officer of SRISA
 Maksim Moshkow, employee, creator of the largest and the oldest Russian electronic library "Lib.ru"

External links 
 Official site of NIISI RAS

References 

Institutes of the Russian Academy of Sciences
Research institutes in the Soviet Union
Computing in the Soviet Union
Computer science institutes